Kiteboarding is a water-based, kite-powered sport
Kiteboarding may also refer to:

Snowkiting, a snow based, kite powered sport
Kite landboarding, a land based, kite powered sport using a four-wheeled board

See also
Windsport